The All Trinidad Sugar and General Workers' Trade Union (ATSGWTU) is a trade union in Trinidad and Tobago. It was founded in 1937 (as the All Trinidad Sugar Estates and Factory Workers Union by the first President General Adrian Cola Rienzi) to represent workers in the sugar industry, but expanded its scope in 1978 to include workers in a variety of sectors.

Due to the closing of the government company, Caroni (1975) Ltd., in 2003 by the Trinidad and Tobago government, the ATSGWTU has lost around 10,000 members. The union is restructuring and attempting to focus on continued growth and development. The union has changed its name to the All Trinidad General Workers' Trade Union, ATGWTU, because of a loss of the country's sugar industry.

Basdeo Panday, the former Prime Minister of Trinidad and Tobago, was the president of the ATSGWTU from 1973 until his appointment as Prime Minister in 1995.

The ATSGWTU is affiliated with the International Trade Union Confederation, National Trade Union Centre of Trinidad and Tobago and the Trinidad & Tobago Blind Welfare Association.

List of President Generals
 Adrian Cola Rienzi (1932-?)
 Lionel Frank Seukeran (1946-1955)
 McDonald Moses (?-?)
 Bhadase Sagan Maraj (?-?)
 Krishna Gowandan (?-?)
 Basdeo Panday (1973-1995)
 Boysie Moore-Jones (1995-1999)
 Rudranath Indarsingh (1999-2012)
 Nirvan Maharaj (2012–present)

See also

 List of trade unions
 All Trinidad Sugar Estates and Factory Workers Union
 Adrian Cola Rienzi

References

External links
 ATGWTU Blogspot
 ATGWTU @ Twitter
 ATGWTU Google plus

Sources
 

Trade unions in Trinidad and Tobago
International Trade Union Confederation
Agriculture and forestry trade unions
Agricultural organizations based in the Caribbean